Snoop Dogg's Hustlaz: Diary of a Pimp is a mixed hardcore pornography and hip hop music video featuring the music of rapper Snoop Dogg, produced by Hustler Video. The video was also directed, co-produced and presented by Snoop, although he does not feature in any sex scenes. In the film's credits, Snoop is listed under the moniker "Snoop Scorsese". The film was released in 2002, a year after Snoop Dogg set the trend of mixed hip hop porn films with Snoop Dogg's Doggystyle.

The film features Snoop hosting a party with more than 40 porn stars. Snoop plays the role of a pimp, who dresses in outlandish outfits, and persuades a prudish journalist to become one of his girls. The film became the top-selling U.S. pornographic film of 2003.

Credits
 Snoop Dogg as The Doggfather (non-sex role)
 Chelsea Blue as Lana Gammons
 Mark Ashley (non-sex role)
 Ashley Long
 Billy Banks
 Chaze
 Cashmere
 Flick Shagwell
 Holly Hollywood
 Honney Bunny
 Jade Hsu
 Nyomi Marcella
 Tony Eveready
 Nikki Fairchild
 Manuel Ferrara
 Steve Hatcher
 Dominico
 India
 Darren James
 Leo
 Monique
 Sin Nye
 Skyy Jolie
 Billy D
 Mr. Marcus
 Brian Pumper
 Rafe (non-sex role)
 Marty Romano
 Taylor St. Clair
 Valentino
 John West
 Jason Zupalo
 Ice La Fox
 Kiwi
 Shyla Stylez
 Dee
 Brittany Skye
 Mia Smiles
 Sabrine Maui (non-sex role)

Controversy 
In the same year as the release of Hustlaz: Diary of a Pimp, Snoop Dogg also acted as the host in the Girls Gone Wild show Doggy Style, where he films a mardi gras party. After the release of the DVD, two women featured in the film accused Snoop Dogg and other members of the production team of coercing them into participating. Snoop settled his part of the lawsuit and formally severed his professional relationship with Girls Gone Wild, citing the lack of racial diversity (namely the overrepresentation of white women) in their videos. In response, he suggested producing an alternative version of the show featuring Black and Latina women more prominently, although the plan for a more racially inclusive pornographic special never came to fruition.

Awards and nominations - partial listing
 2004 AVN Award winner - Top Selling Release of the Year
 2004 AVN Award winner - Best Ethnic-Themed Release - Black
 2004 AVN Award double nominee – Best Non-Sex Performance, Film or Video for Chelsea Blue and, separately, for Snoop Dogg
 2004 AVN Award nominee – Best All-Girl Sex Scene, Video for Mia Smiles, Dee, Holly Hollywood & Ice D’Angelo

See also
 Snoop Dogg filmography, pornographic movies
 Nudity in music videos

References

External links
 
 
 
 
 Review from DVDtalk

Snoop Dogg video albums
Interracial pornographic films
2000s pornographic films
Films directed by Snoop Dogg
2000s English-language films